Madagascar–Russia relations are the bilateral foreign relations between Madagascar and Russia. The establishment of diplomatic relations between Madagascar and the Soviet Union started on September 29, 1972. Russia has an embassy in Antananarivo. Madagascar has an embassy in Moscow.

History

During the 2009 Malagasy political crisis, Russia's Foreign Minister Sergey Lavrov stated that Russia is "concerned by the increased frequency of attempts on the African continent to resort to non-constitutional methods of solving internal political problems." He went on to say that, in addition to increasing economic and social problems, the use of force is of concern and runs counter to democratic principles, whilst affirming Russia's support of the African Union's position.

According to The New York Times, the  2018 Madagascar elections saw Russian operatives commonly being seen walking the streets of Madagascar's capital with "backpacks full of cash" as well as "packets of gold and precious stones" which the Russians used to bribe journalists, candidates, students, and others to influence the election outcome. One key objective of the Russian interference campaign was to protect  Yevgeny Prigozhin's "growing military and commercial footprint" in Africa.

See also
Foreign relations of Madagascar
Foreign relations of Russia

References

External links
 Documents on the Madagascar–Russia relationship from the Russian Ministry of Foreign Affairs  
 Embassy of Madagascar in Moscow  
 Embassy of Russia in Antananarivo  

 
Africa–Russia relations
Russia
Bilateral relations of Russia